The 2012 Campeonato Brasileiro de GT season (Brazilian GT Championship) was the sixth season of Campeonato Brasileiro de GT, the first with this name. The season began on April 21 at Santa Cruz do Sul and ended on December 15 at the Interlagos after eight weekends totalling sixteen races.

Cleber Faria and Duda Rosa won the championship in GT3 class, Carlos Kray and Anderom Toso won in GT Premium, the GT4 championship was winner by Sergio Laganá and Alan Hellmeister.

Class restructure

For the 2012 season, Campeonato Brasileiro de GT will contain three key classes. The GT3 class allows FIA homologated GT3 cars, such as the Ferrari 458 Italia. New to 2012 season is the introduction of the  GT Premium class caters for older, such as the Dodge Viper Competition Coupe or Lamborghini Gallardo LP520. The pairs that have some driver with graduation A, no scored points in the class.

The GT4 class is a merger of Supersport-spec cars and GT4 homologated cars, such as the Ginetta G50 and cars currently used in the Maserati Trofeo and Ferrari Challenge series, based on the Maserati Coupé and Ferrari F430 road cars.

Entries

For the 2012 season, the new BMW Team Brasil will line up in Brasileiro de GT with two GT3 cars developed by BMW Motorsport. Under the guidance of Team Principal Antonio Hermann, the AH Competições squad will also send two BMW Z4 GT3 cars into action in the series and two BMW M3 GT4 in GT4 class. BMW Team Brasil is supported by BMW Brazil.

GT3 class will be updated to include the Lamborghini Gallardo LP600+ and in the fifth round Audi R8 LMS ultra. GT4 class, Lotus Evora GT4 enters in the championship.

Entry list
All drivers were Brazilian-registered.

Race calendar and results
All races were held in Brazil.

Championship standings
Points were awarded as follows:

GT3

GT Premium

GT4

References

External links

Campeonato Brasileiro de GT